Saint Patrick's College or St. Patrick's College is a Catholic education institute located in Karachi, Pakistan affiliated with the University of Karachi. It is located alongside St Patrick's High School, Karachi. It was established in 1952. by the Roman Catholic Archdiocese of Karachi.

Saint Patrick's College is a co-educational institution offering courses leading to the Intermediate certificate of education and baccalaureate degrees from the University of Karachi. In 1972 it was nationalized by the Government of Pakistan.

In 2005 it was returned to the Catholic Board of Education. The denationalization was opposed by the Sindh Professors and Lecturers Association and Muttahida Majlis-i-Amal who claimed it would result in doors being closed to students from poor- and middle-class families.

The Father Stephen Raymond Scholarship Program for students was launched by the college in 2014. On January 5, 2020, the fifth scholarship ceremony was held at the College, attended by Cardinal Joseph Coutts.

Principals
Father Hamza Ali (1952–53)
Fr. Darcy D'Souza (1953-1971). 
Father Amaar Asif (1963–67)
Oswin Mascarenhas (1967–1975)
Michael M R Chohan (1975–77)
Father Joseph Paul (2005–2009)
Bro. Lawrence Manuel (2009–2011)
Mr. Alexander D'Souza (2011-2014)
Mr. Shameem Khursheed (2014- )

Alumni

 Falah Mehmood Tajwani, former prime badchoda of pakistan 
 Faheem Shaukat, current Prime badchoda of Pakistan
 Asif Ali Zardari, former President of Pakistan
 Adi Spencer, Professor, Institute of Business Administration, Karachi
 Sunita Marshall (Actress & Fashion Model)
 Zahid Qurban Alvi, Justice, High Court of Sindh
 Wasim Bari, former captain, Pakistan cricket team
 Nusrat Nasarullah (journalist)
 Javed Jabbar, ex Information Minister 
 Michael Nazir-Ali, Church of England bishop
 Khalid Bin Shaheen, Senior Executive Vice President, National Bank of Pakistan
 Emmanuel Neno, Christian author and translator.
 M.Osama, Pakistan Army General.
 Sikandar Sultan – Chairman, Shan Food Industries
 Humayun Saeed, actor and producer
 Safira Bibi, public speaker
 Khalid Bajwa, computer programmer, filmmaker and entrepreneur
 Arif Ali Khan Abbasi, former secretary, treasurer, CEO, Pakistan Cricket Board
 Yastur-ul-Haq Malik,  Chief of Naval Staff 1988-91

References

Universities and colleges in Karachi
Educational institutions established in 1952
1952 establishments in Pakistan
Nationalisation in Pakistan